D. J. Montgomery (born November 17, 1996) is an American football wide receiver who is a free agent. He played college football at Austin Peay.

College career
Montgomery began his collegiate career at Holmes Community College. As a sophomore, he caught 36 passes for 991 yards and ten touchdowns and was named first-team All-State. He was rated a three-star prospect and committed to transfer to Austin Peay for his remaining eligibility.

Montgomery became a starter in his first season with the Governors and finished second with 19 receptions and 228 receiving yards with three touchdowns. As a senior, he caught 42 passes for 797 yards and ten touchdowns

Professional career

Cleveland Browns
Montgomery signed with the Cleveland Browns as an undrafted free agent on May 3, 2019. He suffered a hamstring injury during training camp and was placed on season-ending injured reserve on August 21, 2019. The Browns waived Montgomery on August 19, 2020.

New York Jets
Montgomery was claimed off waivers by the New York Jets on August 30, 2020. He was released before the start of the regular season and re-signed to the Jets practice squad. Montgomery remained on the Jets' practice squad for the entirety of the 2020 season and signed a reserve/futures contract with the team on January 4, 2021. He was waived at the end of training camp on August 31, 2021, and was re-signed to the practice squad the next day. Montgomery was elevated to the active roster on December 12, 2021, for the team's Week 14 game against the New Orleans Saints. He signed a reserve/future contract with the Jets on January 10, 2022. He was waived on May 10, 2022, then re-signed on May 24, 2022. He was waived on July 26.

Indianapolis Colts
Montgomery was signed by the Indianapolis Colts on August 3, 2022. He was waived on August 22.

Houston Texans
On December 14, 2022, Montgomery was signed to the Houston Texans practice squad.

References

External links
Austin Peay Governors bio
New York Jets bio

1996 births
Living people
Players of American football from Mississippi
American football wide receivers
Holmes Bulldogs football players
Austin Peay Governors football players
New York Jets players
Cleveland Browns players
Indianapolis Colts players
Fellows of the American Physical Society
Houston Texans players